Silver Star Mountain is a recently uplifted ridge of older Western Cascades volcanic rock, underlain by a granitic pluton of similar Western Cascades age, located in the Cascade Range in the U.S. state of Washington. Consisting of late Eocene to Oligocene epoch rock, it lies within the Gifford Pinchot National Forest. Silver Star is composed of three lithologic units (distinct units of rock, each with different physical characteristics), including the large Silver Star Granodiorite unit.

Silver Star Mountain and the surrounding area, in contrast to the rest of the local backcountry, has a ridge-like appearance, creating a striking skyline similar to mountains further north in the Cascade Range. The area lacks trees, and comprises steep cliffs, talus slopes, and meadows filled with wildflowers. The mountain can be hiked and has been noted for its trails by local mountaineers.

Geography 
Silver Star Mountain lies in Skamania County, in the U.S. state of Washington. The mountain lies in the western segment of the Middle Cascades.

Unlike the rest of the western Cascade backcountry, it has a ridge-like appearance, creating a striking skyline similar to mountains further north in the Cascade Range. The area lacks trees and comprises steep cliffs, talus slopes, and meadows filled with wildflowers.

The locale drains into the Washougal River and the Lewis River's East Fork, which flow to the south and west respectively. Precipitation reaches a peak during the winter season, usually deposited as snow that produces drifts, especially in deep canyons in the area. These drifts often remain until the summer, feeding small streams in the vicinity. Surface runoff has increased due to the removal of forest cover by historical fires, including large fires in 1902 and 1929. As a result, runoff has eroded gullies on local slopes and increased removal of soil. The granodiorite is not exposed at the summit or along main approach trails. These often host tarn lakes, and some support snowdrifts.

Soil on and around the mountain has been eroded by repeated fires, including the Yacolt Burn in 1902 and 16 additional fires through 1929. Slow regrowth motivated the Civilian Conservation Corps to plant more trees during the 1930s, and terracing was also used during the 1960s to facilitate better vegetation regrowth.

Ecology 
Wildflowers grow at unusually low elevations at Silver Star Mountain, as a result of fires, wind, and rocky subsoil. There are more than 100 types of wildflowers and flowering shrubs on the volcano, such as heather, star tulip, tiger lily, Grey's loveage, hairbell, bear grass, western bistort, columbine, Avalanche lily, broadleaf lupine, wooly sunflower, Cardwell's penstemon, Indian paintbrush, phlox, balsamroot, and glacier lilies. Trails around the mountain, in addition to offering views of wildflower-cover slopes, pass through thickets of huckleberry, as well as forests with noble fir.

Geology 

In the area surrounding Silver Star Mountain, rocks forms three discrete lithologic units (characterized by visible physical characteristics or the gross physical character of the rock). The Eagle Creek formation is the oldest, likely dating to the Oligocene epoch (or the lower Miocene). The rock consists mostly of cream-colored, vitric tuffs, which have undergone weathering that has converted them to a yellow or white colored soil, though there are also multicolored tuffs, which vary from red to green and purple breccias. Often their color depends on the extent of inner iron compounds. They display little assortment or bedding, indicating that they likely accumulated subaerially. Rocks from the formation form outcrops on the eastern part of the Silver Star Mountain locale, and are exposed in central parts of the Columbia River Gorge. Other exposures from the Eagle Creek formation can be observed in Silver, Bluebird, and Bear creeks, where they occur in canyons along the eastern part of the locale. The second, younger unit is the Skamania Andesites, which sit atop the Eagle Creek deposits and consist of thick layers of andesite interbedded with minor inclusions of breccia and pyroclastic material. Less exposed than the Eagle Creek deposits, they are often detectable within  of the surface, sitting disconformably over the Eagle Creek rock layers as a result of thorough erosion. At other points, including the eastern border of the Silver Star area, they occur between layers of the Eagle Creek tuffs, possibly due to partially overlapping deposition times or the combination of the tuff deposition and andesite extrusion. The Skamania Andesites encompass the largest distribution of the three lithologic formations in the area, forming thin lava flows that suggest extrusion as highly fluid lava. Andesites located higher on the Silver Star Mountain edifice have undergone less erosion than deposits at lower elevations. The age of the Skamania Andesites is not known, though Felts (1939) hypothesized that they were formed during the pre-middle Miocene epoch. They have a gray to green-gray color and are porphyritic, containing smaller amounts of breccia and tuff, as well as phenocrysts with plagioclase, augite, and magnetite. Sometimes, they contain chlorite or similar minerals. Rocks from the upper third of the Skamania Andesites have a similar composition, but they are more vesicular in texture.

The third unit is called the Silver Star Granodiorite, which is made up of augite diorite and quartz diorite. Dikes with quartz, tourmaline, and sericite occur within the mass, which has a light color aggregated from white to pink plagioclase with orthoclase, clear quartz, and black to green biotite and hornblende crystals. It has steep walls which have not been excavated by local canyons that cut into nearby rock. Felts (1939) suggested that the stock intruded at an angle of 20 degrees east of north. The stock cuts through the Eagle Creek formation and the lower two-thirds of the Skamania Andesites, forming contact metamorphic rock and small dikes of granodiorite and aplite into their tuff and andesite deposits. The absence of dikes or intrusions in the upper third of the Skamania Andesites formation suggests a time gap between the extrusion of the lower and upper segments, during which the granodiorite intrusion occurred. The granodiorite has been altered to create talus, and there are few outcrops, which only occur at stream bottoms and rarely at cliffs that have not been covered with talus. Lava flows from several more modern sources, likely Pleistocene, were deposited in the Lewis River canyon  to the west of the Silver Star Mountain and in the Wind River canyon to the east.

Silver Star Mountain consists of late Eocene epoch to Oligocene epoch rock, particularly calc-alkaline volcaniclastic sediment, from a number of unidentified volcanic vents. These rock formations were intruded on the mountain's eastern side by the Silver Star intrusion, a deep stock of granodiorite and quartz diorite that also formed small deposits of copper in the area. Calc-alkaline volcaniclastic sediments, referred to as the Skamania Volcanics, lie nearby and are overlapped by the Troutdale Formation. During the Miocene epoch, these deposits formed hills to the north of the major Columbia River valley, with sufficient height to prevent flooding.

The intrusion of the Silver Star stock produced small deposits of gold, zinc, copper, zeolites, quartz and calcite in the surrounding country rock. Per the Skamania County Soil Survey, small abandoned gold mines can be found in creek bottoms throughout the area. E.A. Dole, an early settler, struck silver near the mountain in 1874. He named the mine Silver Star Quartz Ledge. The ore gathered was assayed at 41.17 silver and 63.72 lead per ton. The intrusion produced at least one dike of granodiorite, which sits nearby. Much of the local soil formed from granodiorite deposits and volcanic ash.

Human history 
A number of ditches near Silver Star Mountain known as the Indian Pits can be seen on one of the trails, which is known as the Indian Pits Trail #180E. These ditches also occur in other parts of the Columbia River Gorge area. Archaeologists debate the purpose of these pits, though three prominent hypotheses have emerged. One states that the pits were built by Native Americans  to seek spiritual visions, while another claims that the pits served as blinds for hunting mountain sheep and goats fleeing cougars or wolves down local talus slopes or other hunters in brush below. The third hypothesis theorizes that the pits were used to store food.

The September 1902 Yacolt Burn started as a slash fire near the city of Stevenson. The Yacolt Burn State Forest was named after the 1902 fire.

Recreation 
The Silver Star Mountain area is lightly used for hiking. Indian Pits Trail #180E and Pyramid Rock Trail #180F branch off the Silver Star Trail to the south of Silver Star Mountain. From Ed's Trail #180A, named after Edward Robinson, one of the pioneers of the Chinook Trail Association, hikers can see views of nearby volcanoes, including Mount St. Helens, Mount Rainier, Mount Adams, Mount Hood, and Mount Jefferson on particularly clear days. Trail #172 Bluff Mountain offers views of the Vancouver and Portland metropolitan area.

The trail area is administered by the United States Forest Service, and the Mount Adams Ranger District serves as its information center. A number of the trails were built by and are still maintained by the Chinook Trails Association.

References

Sources 

 .
 
 .
 
 .

External links 

Gifford Pinchot National Forest
Columbia River
Columbia River Gorge